Atkins is a census-designated place (CDP) in Smyth County, Virginia, United States. The population was 1,143 at the 2010 census.

History
The Old Stone Tavern was listed on the National Register of Historic Places in 1982.

Geography
Atkins is located at  (36.868967, −81.410030).

According to the United States Census Bureau, the CDP has a total area of 5.4 square miles (14.0 km2), all of it land.

Demographics
As of the census of 2000, there were 1,138 people, 494 households, and 329 families residing in the CDP. The population density was 210.6 people per square mile (81.4/km2). There were 571 housing units at an average density of 105.7/sq mi (40.8/km2). The racial makeup of the CDP was 98.95% White, 0.09% Native American, 0.53% from other races, and 0.44% from two or more races. Hispanic or Latino of any race were 0.88% of the population.

There were 494 households, out of which 26.9% had children under the age of 18 living with them, 50.0% were married couples living together, 11.5% had a female householder with no husband present, and 33.2% were non-families. 29.1% of all households were made up of individuals, and 11.9% had someone living alone who was 65 years of age or older. The average household size was 2.30 and the average family size was 2.81.

In the CDP, the population was spread out, with 21.6% under the age of 18, 9.1% from 18 to 24, 28.4% from 25 to 44, 26.4% from 45 to 64, and 14.6% who were 65 years of age or older. The median age was 38 years. For every 100 females, there were 90.3 males. For every 100 females age 18 and over, there were 86.6 males.

The median income for a household in the CDP was $26,667, and the median income for a family was $30,625. Males had a median income of $23,274 versus $17,000 for females. The per capita income for the CDP was $17,516. About 5.6% of families and 9.6% of the population were below the poverty line, including 7.6% of those under age 18 and 6.5% of those age 65 or over.

References

Census-designated places in Smyth County, Virginia
Census-designated places in Virginia
U.S. Route 11